Casablanca bombings may refer to:

 Bombing of Casablanca (1907), a French naval bombardment that marked the beginning of the French conquest of Morocco
 2003 Casablanca bombings, a series of suicide bombings in Casablanca, Morocco
 2007 Casablanca bombings, a series of suicide bombings in Casablanca, Morocco